Regular matrix may refer to:

Mathematics
 Regular stochastic matrix, a stochastic matrix such that all the entries of some power of the matrix are positive
 The opposite of irregular matrix, a matrix with a different number of entries in each row
 Regular Hadamard matrix, a Hadamard matrix whose row and column sums are all equal
 A regular element of a Lie algebra, when the Lie algebra is gln
 Invertible matrix (this usage is rare)

Other uses
 QS Regular Matrix, a quadraphonic sound system developed by Sansui Electric